Wilma J. Webb (born 1944) is an American politician who was a member of the Colorado General Assembly from 1980 to 1993. She sponsored dozens of bills including school reform and equality initiatives. She is best known for sponsoring legislation that adopted Martin Luther King Jr.'s birthday as a Colorado state holiday before it became the federal Martin Luther King Jr. Day holiday, and for her efforts to educate the young about King's legacy.

Early life and education 
Webb was born in Denver, Colorado, to Faye and Frank Gerdine. She attended the University of Colorado Denver without obtaining a degree. As a state legislator, she attended the Harvard Kennedy School in 1988.

Career 
She married Wellington Webb in 1969. He later became the first African American mayor of Denver, in office from 1991 to 2003. She was the first First Lady of Denver to have held political office herself.

During her time in the Colorado General Assembly, she became the first African-American member of the legislature's Joint Budget Committee (the legislature's most powerful six-member committee), helping write the state's $4 billion budget in 1981.

She has been recognized by several organizations including the National Education Association. She was inducted into the Colorado Women's Hall of Fame in 1991.

Personal life 
She and her husband have four adult children. She is a member of Zion Baptist Church of Denver, Colorado, and of the Delta Sigma Theta sorority.

References

1944 births
Living people
African-American state legislators in Colorado
African-American women in politics
First ladies of Denver
Members of the Colorado House of Representatives
Women state legislators in Colorado
Harvard Kennedy School alumni
21st-century African-American people
21st-century African-American women
20th-century African-American people
20th-century African-American women